Walling Cobblestone Tavern is a historic tavern located at Sodus in Wayne County, New York.  The Federal style, cobblestone building is a two-story, five bay, gable roofed structure. It was built about 1834 and is constructed of irregularly shaped, multi-colored, field cobbles. It is now a single-family dwelling. The structure is among the approximately 170 surviving cobblestone buildings in Wayne County.

It was listed on the National Register of Historic Places in 1994.

References

External links
Office of the County Historian: Sodus, New York

Houses on the National Register of Historic Places in New York (state)
Federal architecture in New York (state)
Cobblestone architecture
Houses completed in 1834
Houses in Wayne County, New York
National Register of Historic Places in Wayne County, New York